is a passenger railway station in located in the city of Tsu,  Mie Prefecture, Japan, operated by the private railway operator Kintetsu Railway.

Lines
Kawai-Takaoka Station is served by the Osaka Line, and is located 104.4 rail kilometers from the starting point of the line at Ōsaka Uehommachi Station.

Station layout
The station was consists of two opposed side platforms, connected by a level crossing. The station is unattended.

Platforms

Adjacent stations

History
Kawaitakaoka Station opened on November 19, 1930 as a station on the Sangu Express Electric Railway. After merging with Osaka Electric Kido on March 15, 1941, the line became the Kansai Express Railway's Osaka Line. This line was merged with the Nankai Electric Railway on June 1, 1944 to form Kintetsu.

Passenger statistics
In fiscal 2019, the station was used by an average of 686 passengers daily (boarding passengers only).

Surrounding area
Ichishi Station of the Meishō Line.
Tsu City Kazushi Junior High School
Tsu City Takaoka Elementary School
former Ichishi Town Hall

See also
List of railway stations in Japan

References

External links

Kintetsu: Kawaitakaoka Station

Railway stations in Japan opened in 1930
Railway stations in Mie Prefecture
Stations of Kintetsu Railway
Tsu, Mie